Markus Gabriel (born April 6, 1980) is a German philosopher and author at the University of Bonn. In addition to his more specialized work, he has also written popular books about philosophical issues.

Career
Gabriel was educated in philosophy and Ancient Greek in Germany. After completing his doctorate and habilitation at Heidelberg University, he held a faculty position at New School for Social Research. He then came to the University of Bonn, where he holds the chair for Epistemology, Modern and Contemporary Philosophy and is Director of the International Centre for Philosophy. Gabriel has also been a visiting professor at University of California, Berkeley.

Work

Gabriel argues against Physicalism, Moral nihilism, and Neurocentrism.

Physicalism 
In 2013, Gabriel wrote Transcendental Ontology: Essays in German Idealism. In the Notre Dame Philosophical Reviews Sebastian Gardner wrote that the work is "Gabriel's most comprehensive presentation to date, in English, of his reading of German Idealism" and notes that "due to its compression of a wealth of ideas into such a short space, the book demands quite a lot from its readers."

In a 2018 interview, Gabriel complained that "most contemporary metaphysicians are [sloppy] when it comes to characterizing their subject matter," using words like "the world" and "reality" "often...interchangeably and without further clarifications. In my view, those totality of words do not refer to anything which is capable of having the property of existence."  He goes on to explain:

I try to revive the tradition of metaontology and metametaphysics that departs from Kant. As has been noticed, Heidegger introduced the term metaontology and he also clearly states that Kant’s philosophy is a “metaphysics about metaphysics.” I call metametaphysical nihilism the view that there is no such thing as the world such that questions regarding its ultimate nature, essence, structure, composition, categorical outlines etc. are devoid of the intended conceptual content. The idea that there is a big thing comprising absolutely everything is an illusion, albeit neither a natural one nor an inevitable feature of reason as such. Of course, there is an influential Neo-Carnapian strand in the contemporary debate which comes to similar conclusions. I agree with a lot of what is going on in this area of research and I try to combine it with the metaontological/metametaphysical tradition of Kantian and Post-Kantian philosophy.

In an April 2020 interview he called European measures against COVID-19 unjustified and a step towards cyber dictatorship, saying the use of health apps was a Chinese or North Korean strategy. He said the coronavirus crisis called into question the idea that only scientific and technical progress could lead to human and moral progress. He said there was a paradox of virocracy, to save lives one replaced democracy by virocracy.

Publications

Monographs 
 
 
 
 
 
 
 
 
 
 
 
 (en) The Meaning of Thought, Polity, 2020, ISBN ‎ 978-1509538362
 
 
 
 
 
 
 
 (en) With Graham Priest: Everything and Nothing, Polity, 2022, ISBN 978-1-5095-3747-1

Popular Science 
 Warum es die Welt nicht gibt, Ullstein Buchverlage GmbH, 2013, ISBN 978-3-548-37568-7
 Ich ist nicht Gehirn: Philosophie des Geistes für das 21. Jahrhundert, Ullstein, 2015, ISBN 978-3-548-37680-6

Editions (publisher, co-editor or co-worker)

References

External links 
 Homepage Markus Gabriel
 Official profile at EDGE

1980 births
21st-century German philosophers
Continental philosophers
Living people
Academic staff of the University of Bonn
University of California, Berkeley College of Letters and Science faculty
Philosophical realism
Philosophers of technology
Philosophers of science
Philosophers of art
Philosophers of culture
German male writers